(born 19 April 1989 in Almaty) is a Kazakh beauty pageant titleholder. She was crowned Miss Kazakhstan 2013. Isaeva represented Kazakhstan at the Miss Universe 2014 pageant.

Life and career 
Aiday studied medicine at the Kazakh National Medical University.

Pageantry

Miss Kazakhstan 2008 
Having the Miss Shymkent title, Aiday previously participated in Miss Kazakhstan 2008.

Miss Kazakhstan 2013 
Aiday was crowned as Miss Kazakhstan 2013 represented Almaty at the national pageant at the Palace of the Republic in Almaty, Kazakhstan, on December 5, 2013.

Miss Universe 2014 
Aiday competed at the Miss Universe 2014 pageant but Unplaced.

References

External links 
Official Miss Kazakhstan website

Miss Universe 2014 contestants
Kazakhstani beauty pageant winners
Living people
People from Almaty
1989 births
Miss Kazakhstan winners